Vadencourt is a commune in the Somme department in Hauts-de-France in northern France.

Geography

Population

Places of interest
 Château : Both wings of the building are flanked with a round tower emphasizing the impression of fortification, while allowing controlled access to the semicircular inner courtyard. The good state of repair of the roof contrasts with the state of neglect observed in the courtyard, whose cobblestones are beginning to be invaded by high grass.
 The church

See also
Communes of the Somme department

References

Communes of Somme (department)